Tabarja is an ancient coastal village in Lebanon, situated in Kesrouan,

Etymology

The name "Tabarja" is of uncertain origins. It bears a similarity to the Turkic word "Tabarjin", which means "battle axe", and also to the Persian word "Tub" which means medicine or health, and furthermore the word "Tabar" which if translated loosely can mean "weapon" in more ancient Turkic dialects. All three of these translations are disputed, as there has been no particular study of the linguistic origins of the ancient seaside town's name. Invariably, the name of the town is said to pertain to "King Bargis", a pre-Christian king who is said to have ruled over the area in the era of city states, which would imply a ante-Arab or even ante-Romanic origin. Local oral history dictates that the town is named in honour of the aforementioned king, whom supposedly faced an adversary in combat and showed him mercy before being murdered by a khopesh (Specifically, a "sickle sword" transliterated to English) to the back. However no confirmation nor scholarly study has been conducted on the matter, and it is inherently dependent on local oral history and scholastic conjecture based on dubious sources pertinent to the surrounding area. The most likely conclusion, is that perhaps the town predates any documentation and that the name is, in fact, ancient and will not be deciphered before proper anthropological and archaeological study. What is certain, is that the town itself is most certainly ancient in the most literal sense of the word, and worthy of proper study by the historic community.

Studies conducted by proper authorities tended to refer to the so called "ru'assa" of Tabarja, the House of El Azzi, which does not predate the 19th century in the area. Though scholarly and militaristic in nature, the family has not claimed to know the origin of the name, nor have they claimed their so called "demesne" as having been theirs before the exodus from the Chouf in the 1860s. As such, it can most certainly be ruled that the origins of the name are uncertain.

Background
The main attraction of the town is its fishing port, where Saint Paul is said to have set sail on one of his missionary trips to Europe.  One of the modern beach resorts, a Brutalist masterpiece, built near the port is named in honor of Saint Paul and currently towers over the bay. The other resorts in the town are named after another local figure, King Bargis, whose castle they are built atop of, alongside the local church. The Triple church of St. George is a popular historic Maronitic site in the town and has an ossuary with the town's individual family crypts as well as elaborate statuary and engravings. The religious structure is over a century old and was built on a pagan site, Phoenician and Roman, referenced as a possible altar to Adonis or another local deity.

Large Roman stones are still visible today in the walls of the church, as well as undated stones featuring Rabbullah Maronite Crosses that possibly date to the Crusades. A sea-level cave near the church is also named in honor of Saint George, but has been severely damaged over the years due to modernization and land disputes. This rock formation among the unique limestone rock formations on the coast had been considered sacred for centuries, and sick infants were brought by their mothers for immersion in the salt water of the cave in order to receive a supernatural cure through Saint George. As of 2019, an extensive site of Byzantine ruins have been discovered under the village. Extending for miles under the farmlands and more recent construction, the indication seems to be that Tabarja was once relatively large. Throughout most of its modern history, though, the village had been home to only a hundred or so people, mostly under unofficial fealty to the "ruʾasā" of the House of El Azzi. Either through natural disaster, or possibly as a result of the Crusades, the old and fairly metropolitan port city that rests below Tabarja was abandoned almost entirely.

Several hidden Greco-Roman vaults are located in Tabarja, and the Tabarja Bay also has numerous underwater caves and a freshwater current from an unknown source. The town has a unique limestone and mortar sewer system built by the French and expanded by the local municipality at the turn of the century. It also has a fully functioning and integrated Ottoman-style aqueduct system that services the older limestone homes and the extensive farmlands to the Southwest, which was expanded extensively by the House of El Azzi using their own funds in the 1950s and 1960s. The town once also featured a railway that passed through the main street, which was operational until the early 1990s but has since been damaged by modernization and a lack of firm regulations after the war. The town also houses several 19th century and earlier Lebanese homes. The Second El Azzi Home of the 19th century is built on a cliffside using mortar and limestone stilts which once bordered with the local bay but has been encroached upon by modern construction, topped with a recent structure of unrelated ownership, and converted to an inn. Local oral tradition states that said house was built over a chest of gold coins, and that a long-dead apparition of the El Azzi family appears at the equinox to point in the direction of the buried gold of the once-powerful nautical family. The eldest Azzi home, however, stands atop a hillside and bears a plaque with an inscription dating to the 1890s. It stands beside what was once an old caravanserai for pilgrims, which was purchased by the family in the early 1900s and formerly belonged to the Bouery family.

The town at one point also featured old salt evaporation ponds on its South-West coastline, but they have since been destroyed and replaced with modern construction or paved over. The town also featured a small undated mortar lighthouse, which was recently demolished by a tidal wave. It was thought to date back to at least the time in which ship-bound trading was common in the area, which ended around the early 20th century and spans back millennia, and once operated via a kerosene and later electric torch. The lighthouse was built atop the rock formations that border most of the town's coastline.

Tabarja today is a popular summer resort town among Lebanese families and foreigners. Tabarja Beach in particular features a dramatic deep-water cove dominated by a 14th-century watch tower, though this is located on the outskirts of the town and not the bay itself. The bay itself is still, as it has been for millennia, used as a mooring area for both modern boats and traditional Lebanese wooden "Haskeh" and "shakhtoora" craft, and rentals are available upon request from any of the local establishments.

The second-eldest resort hotel (Superseded by St. Georges Resort of Beirut) from the Lebanese economic boom of the 20th century is located in Tabarja. The resort is known as King Bargis I, named in honour of King Bargis of local fame, and was built by a local historic figure, Reis Nabih El Azzi, who is responsible for connecting the town to the electric grid and investing in the town's infrastructure and standards of living.

Tabarja also has an uncommon composition of foreign originating Maronite families such as the House of El Azzi ruʾasā and the family of Nakouzi respectively, and the large number of immigrants which still inhabit the area among local families such as the House of Dargham (which has inhabited the area for millennia) and the family Bouery. There are also many Russian, Romanian and other Slavic inhabitants that arrived as victims of human trafficking during the Civil War, but have since occasionally settled in and become members of the community. Prostitution, however, is still common in the nautical town, dating back to the age of sail and the French use of Senegalese and other colonial troops during the French Mandate.

Tabarja was also one of the last towns in Lebanon to host a public execution, prompting the de facto abstinence from the death penalty. Tabarja was also, unlike many isolated villages, struck hard by the Lebanese Civil War.

On 18 December 1996 a minibus carrying Syrian workers was ambushed by gunmen in Tabarja. The driver was killed and seven passengers wounded. At the time it was estimated there were around one million Syrian workers in Lebanon.

References

External links

News coverage of the execution
Tabarja - Kfar Yassine, Localiban 

Populated places in Keserwan District